Moyen-Cavally Region is a defunct region of Ivory Coast. From 2000 to 2011, it was a first-level subdivision region. The region's capital was Guiglo and its area was 14,268 km2. Since 2011, the area formerly encompassed by the region is part of Montagnes District.

Creation
Moyen-Cavally Region was created in 2000 by splitting-off Duékoué Department, Guiglo Department, and Toulépleu Department from Dix-Huit Montagnes Region.

Administrative divisions
At the time of its dissolution, Moyen-Cavally Region was divided into four departments: Bloléquin, Duékoué, Guiglo, and Toulépleu.

Abolition
Moyen-Cavally Region was abolished as part of the 2011 administrative reorganisation of the subdivisions of Ivory Coast. The area formerly encompassed by the region is now part of Montagnes District. The territory of the department of Duékoué was combined with the former Dix-Huit Montagnes Region's Bangolo and Kouibly Departments to create the new second-level Guémon Region. The territory of the remaining departments—Bloléquin, Guiglo, and Toulépleu—were combined to create Cavally Region, another region of the new Montagnes District.

References

Former regions of Ivory Coast
States and territories disestablished in 2011
2011 disestablishments in Ivory Coast
2000 establishments in Ivory Coast
States and territories established in 2000